AgostoDos Pictures is an indie film studio of actor Dingdong Dantes. The name of the film studio is derived from the actor's birthday, August 2.

Filmography

2011

2012

2014

References

External links
 

Film production companies of the Philippines
Philippine film studios
Companies established in 2011